Minnesota State Highway 218 was a highway that originally ran from U.S. Route 218 in St. Paul to U.S. Route 210 in Brainerd. In 1935, it was extended south to Owatonna along the former route of U.S. 218. Around 1949, it was extended north of Brainerd to Merrifield.

Route description
Highway 218 ran generally north-south, passing through Brainerd, Pierz, Foley, Becker, Big Lake, Elk River, Anoka, Minneapolis, St. Paul, Rosemount, Farmington, Northfield, Faribault, and Owatonna.

It ran concurrent with U.S. Routes 10, 12, and 52 at various points between St. Paul and Becker.

The route ran through the counties of Rice, Dakota, Ramsey, Hennepin, Anoka, Sherburne, Benton, Morrison, and Crow Wing.

History
State Highway 218 was authorized in 1933 from St. Paul to Brainerd. In 1935, U.S. Route 218 was truncated to end in Owatonna, and the MN-218 designation was extended along this route.

In 1949, it was extended north of Brainerd to the town of Merrifield.

The route was decommissioned in 1961. The bulk of the road south of St. Paul became State Highway 3, and most of the route north of Becker became State Highway 25.

Major intersections

References

External links

218
Transportation in Minneapolis–Saint Paul